James Baker Cone (March 10, 1825 – March 25, 1897) was a Texas politician for the Democrats during the Twentieth Texas Legislature. He was a member of the Knights of Labor, and clashed with the more conservative and libertarian members of his party like George Clark, who campaigned to become the nominee for Texas governor in 1892.

References

1825 births
1897 deaths
Democratic Party members of the Texas House of Representatives
Knights of Labor people
19th-century American politicians
Trade unionists from Texas